This is a list of WBC Muaythai diamond champions, showing diamond champions certificated by the World Boxing Council Muaythai (WBC Muaythai). The WBC, which is one of the four major governing bodies in professional boxing, started certifying their own Muay Thai world champions in 19 different weight classes in 2005.

Middleweight

Super welterweight

Super lightweight

Super Bantamweight

See also
List of WBC Muaythai world champions
List of IBF Muaythai world champions

References

Lists of Muay Thai champions
WBC